Comsteel is an Australian manufacturer of steel products based in the Newcastle suburb of Waratah. It is a subsidiary of American Industrial Partners.

History
Comsteel was founded as Commonwealth Steel Products in 1918 by Clyde Engineering, Goninan & Co, Pioneer Spring Co and Ritchie Brothers to manufacture wheels, tyres, axles and steel castings for railway use.

A plant was established in the Newcastle suburb of Waratah with Howard Smith acquiring a shareholding. After Vickers acquired a shareholding, in 1923 it was renamed Vickers Commonwealth Steel Products. In the 1930s, BHP gradually bought out the other shareholders and it became the Commonwealth Steel Company. In 1959, a mill was opened in Unanderra for the cold rolling of stainless steel. In 1971, Comsteel was licensed by Midland-Ross to produce couplers, draft gears and freight wagon bogies.

In 1983, Commonwealth Steel Company and the Australian subsidiary of Vickers merged to form Comsteel with BHP and Vickers each holding 38% shareholdings. In 1985 Comsteel was purchased by Australian National Industries (ANI).

It was included in the 1999 takeover of ANI by Smorgon Steel which in turn was purchased by OneSteel in 2007. Since 2016 it has been owned by American Industrial Partners.

References

External links
Company website

BHP
Companies based in Newcastle, New South Wales
Manufacturing companies of Australia
Manufacturing companies established in 1918
Vickers
Australian companies established in 1918